Grenadian Trinbagonians are citizen or resident of the Republic of Trinidad and Tobago whose ethnic origins lie fully or partially in Grenada.

History and settlement 

Grenadians first came to Trinidad in the early 19th century.

Demographics 

They are 50,000 Grenadian-born are living in the Republic of Trinidad and Tobago.

Notable people

Grenadian ancestry 
Destra Garcia
Fay-Ann Lyons
Trevor McDonald
Billy Ocean
Superblue

Grenadian-born  

Mighty Sparrow
Tubal Uriah Butler

Ethnic groups in Trinidad and Tobago
 
People of African descent